Geum Kyo-jin (born 3 January 1992) is a South Korean footballer who plays as a full-back.

Career
He joined Daegu FC in 2014.

References

External links 

1992 births
Living people
Yeungnam University alumni
Association football fullbacks
South Korean footballers
Daegu FC players
Daejeon Hana Citizen FC players
FC Seoul players
Seoul E-Land FC players
K League 2 players
Korea National League players
K League 1 players